Technical Aesthetics (Техническая эстетика in Russian) was a Soviet monthly magazine published between January 1964 and July 1992 dedicated to questions of design with peak distribution of 30,000 copies. It was edited by the VNIITE, the All-Union Technical Aesthetics Research Institute. Some of the topics it covered were the history, theory and practice of design in Russia and abroad, ergonomics, art and design education, and reviews of design exhibitions and books. The magazine regularly exposed Western design trends and innovations, which were often compared with their Soviet counterparts. It also rehabilitated the memory of movements such as Russian constructivism, which had been condemned by Stalin in favour of Socialist realism, even if they set the foundations of Russian design in the early 1920s.

According to art historian Alexandra Chiriac, the term technical aesthetics was invented in Russia in the 1960s to speak about the field of design, which wasn't really developed in the country at the time, and which was promoted through the VNIITE research institute and the Technical Aesthetics magazine.

References

External links 
Scanned issues from 1988 of the Technical Aesthetics magazine.

Magazines published in the Soviet Union
Design magazines
Product design